Bedfordshire Golf Club is a golf club to the east of Stagsden, Bedfordshire, England. Established in 1891, it is the oldest golf club in Bedfordshire. The club moved to Stagsden in 2000 where a new 18-hole course designed by Cameron Sinclair was built.

References

External links
Official site

Golf clubs and courses in Bedfordshire
1891 establishments in England